Zomba Malosa is a constituency for the National Assembly of Malawi, located in the Zomba District of Malawi's Southern Region. It elects one Member of Parliament by the first past the post system. The constituency is currently represented by People's Party MP Roy Kachale Banda, who succeeded his mother and former President Joyce Banda.

Election results

References

Constituencies of the National Assembly of Malawi